Cosmas Rono Kipkorir (born 12 December 1984) is a male Kenyan middle-distance runner who specializes in the 800 metres. At age category level, he was the silver medallist in the event at the World Youth Championships in Athletics in 2001 and the gold medallist at the 2003 African Junior Athletics Championships.

He represented his country at senior level at the 2006 Commonwealth Games. His personal best for the 800 m is 1:45.24 minutes.

International competitions

Personal bests

References

External links

1984 births
Living people
Kenyan male middle-distance runners
Commonwealth Games competitors for Kenya
Athletes (track and field) at the 2006 Commonwealth Games
21st-century Kenyan people